Kali is a city and a municipality in Ahmadabad district in the Indian state of Gujarat.

Demographics
 India census, Kali had a population of 34,223. Males constitute 53% of the population and females 47%. Kali has an average literacy rate of 82%, higher than the national average of 59.5%: male literacy is 86%, and female literacy is 77%. In Kali, 10% of the population is under 6 years of age.

References

Cities and towns in Ahmedabad district